Bahrain Confidential is an English language monthly lifestyle and luxury magazine published from Manama, Bahrain, by Arabian Magazines, a division of CG Arabia SPC. The magazine is based in Manama, the capital of Bahrain.

History and profile
Launched in 2001, Bahrain Confidential is a luxury lifestyle magazine. It covers lifestyle, luxury, fashion and dining, as well as local events, art, society, fashion, beauty and travel.

References

2001 establishments in Bahrain
English-language magazines
Fashion magazines
Lifestyle magazines
Magazines published in Bahrain
Magazines established in 2001
Mass media in Manama
Monthly magazines